József Künsztler (1897 in Budapest – 1977 in Nicosia) was a Hungarian footballer and manager. He won one Greek championship as manager with Panathinaikos F.C. in 1930 and 8 Cypriot championships with APOEL FC. Until today, he is the coach with the most championships in Cyprus.

Honours
Greek Championships: 1930
Athens Championships: 1929, 1930, 1931, 1934, 1937, 1939
Cypriot Championships: 1936, 1937, 1938, 1939, 1940, 1947, 1948, 1949
Cypriot Cups: 1937, 1941, 1947, 1951

External links
Ήρθε, έβαλε σφραγίδα κι έφυγε αθόρυβα, ξεχασμένος απ' όλους politis-sports.com

1897 births
1977 deaths
Footballers from Budapest
Hungarian footballers
Hungarian expatriate footballers
Hungarian Jews
Jewish footballers
Újpest FC players
Expatriate footballers in Germany
Hungarian football managers
Hungarian expatriate football managers
Panathinaikos F.C. managers
APOEL FC managers
Expatriate football managers in Cyprus
Expatriate football managers in Greece
Greece national football team managers
Association football wingers